Marysa Baradji-Duchêne (born 17 October 1982) is a French épée fencer.

Baradji-Duchêne won the silver medal in the épée team event at the 2006 World Fencing Championships after losing to China in the final. She accomplished this with her team mates Hajnalka Kiraly Picot, Maureen Nisima, and Laura Flessel-Colovic.

Achievements
 2006 European Seniors Fencing Championship, épée

References

1982 births
French female épée fencers
Living people
Place of birth missing (living people)